Grace Episcopal Church is a historic Episcopal church located at Lake View Drive and Weber Street in Trenton, Jones County, North Carolina. It was built in 1885, and is a small, rectangular board-and-batten frame Carpenter Gothic style building.  It rests on a low brick foundation and has a gable roof topped by a steeple.  The church was consecrated on June 12, 1892.

It was listed on the National Register of Historic Places in 1972.

References

Episcopal church buildings in North Carolina
Churches on the National Register of Historic Places in North Carolina
Churches completed in 1885
19th-century Episcopal church buildings
Carpenter Gothic church buildings in North Carolina
Buildings and structures in Jones County, North Carolina
National Register of Historic Places in Jones County, North Carolina